Bariwali (translation: The Landlady, English-language title: The Lady of the House) is a Bengali film released in 2000 directed by Rituparno Ghosh. The film features Kirron Kher, Roopa Ganguly, and Chiranjeet Chakraborty.

Synopsis 
The film is a quiet drama about a lonely, sad, unfortunate middle-aged woman. Banalata (Kiron Kher) who has lived a solitary existence since her husband-to-be died the night before their wedding from a snake bite. Never having quite gotten over the tragedy, she rarely ventures out and is clearly very lonely. This changes when she agrees to allow a film production unit to shoot in a wing in her sprawling estate. Suddenly her house is filled with movie stars and glamorous people, including the beautiful actress Sudeshna (Roopa Ganguly) and charming director Deepankar (Chiranjeet Chakraborty). Though she knows that not only is Deepankar married but that his former lover Sudeshna still holds a torch for him, the lonely woman finds herself drawn to the director. He is exactly the sort of worldly character whom she has always longed to meet. The rakish man flirts back and even persuades Banalata to appear in a bit part in the movie. Yet once the film crew decamps, things at the estate return to the same grinding tedium as before, though the woman feels her isolation all the more acutely. The letters that Banalata writes to Deepankar go unanswered, and her bit part in the movie ends up on the cutting-room floor.

Cast 
 Kirron Kher as Banalata, voice dubbed by Rita Koiral
 Chiranjeet Chakraborty as Deepanakar, voice dubbed by Sabyasachi Chakrabarty
 Roopa Ganguly as Sudeshna Mitra
 Sudipta Chakraborty as Malati
 Surya Chatterjee as Prasanna
 Abhishek Chatterjee as Abhijeet
 Shiboprosad Mukherjee as Debashish
 Rukkmini Ghosh

Awards 
National Film Award for Best Actress for Kirron Kher
National Film Award  for Best Supporting Actress for Sudipta Chakraborty
Netpac Award for Rituparno Ghosh (tied with Yuji Nakae for Nabbie's Love)

Controversy 
Rita Koiral, an Indian actress in the Bengali language, in a 2017 TV show, claimed, she was asked to withhold to the media, the fact that she had dubbed the voice of actress Kirron Kher. Her contribution was not declared in the national awards nominations for the movie.

References

External links

 Critical look at Bariwali - Sydney Film Festival

2000 films
Bengali-language Indian films
Films featuring a Best Actress National Award-winning performance
Films featuring a Best Supporting Actress National Film Award-winning performance
Films directed by Rituparno Ghosh
2000s Bengali-language films